Yelisaveta Petrovna Bagriantseva (27 August 1929 – 24 January 1996) was a Russian discus thrower who won a silver medal at the 1952 Summer Olympics.

Bagryantseva was born in a Siberian salt-mining town and first trained in cross-country skiing. She changed to discus throw only when moved to Novosibirsk to study at the Novosibirsk College of Physical Education. She graduated in 1941, and until 1949 worked as a physical education teacher in Irkutsk. She then moved to Moscow to continue her sports studies at the Moscow Institute of Physical Education, and the same year won silver medals at the national championships and at the World Student Games. She won two more silver medals, at the 1951 World Student Games and 1952 Olympics.

Bagryantseva married the pole vaulter Yury Verkhoshansky, during a break between morning and evening sessions of the national championships. Together they later worked as athletics coaches in Russia and Italy.

References

1929 births
1996 deaths
Russian female discus throwers
Soviet female discus throwers
Olympic silver medalists for the Soviet Union
Athletes (track and field) at the 1952 Summer Olympics
Olympic athletes of the Soviet Union
Medalists at the 1952 Summer Olympics
Olympic silver medalists in athletics (track and field)
Sportspeople from Irkutsk Oblast